Colin Jones   was Dean of St. George's Cathedral, Cape Town from 1988 to 1995.

Notes 

20th-century South African Anglican priests
Deans of Cape Town